Major-General Arthur Gordon Patterson  (24 July 1917 – 27 May 1996) was a British Army officer who commanded 17th Gurkha Division.

Military career
Patterson was born in British India, the son of Arthur Abbey Patterson of the Indian Civil Service, and educated at Tonbridge School, Kent. He was commissioned into the British Indian Army in 1938. He served in World War II with the 6th Gurkha Rifles being awarded the Military Cross for his exploits in Burma in May 1945. In 1951 he was deployed to Malaya at the height of the Malayan Emergency for which he was appointed MBE. He was later given command of a battalion of his Regiment and appointed OBE for further service in Malaya. In 1964, as a temporary Brigadier during the Indonesia–Malaysia confrontation, he took part in the response to the Brunei Revolt rounding up escaped rebel leaders in the swamps and jungles over a wide area of North Borneo for which he was awarded the DSO. He was appointed General Officer Commanding 17th Gurkha Division in December 1965 and Director of Military Training in June 1969 before retiring in 1972.

He was given the Colonelcy of the 6th Queen Elizabeth's Own Gurkha Rifles from 1969 to 1974.

References

 

1917 births
1996 deaths
Military personnel of British India
British Army generals
Companions of the Order of the Bath
Companions of the Distinguished Service Order
Officers of the Order of the British Empire
Recipients of the Military Cross
Indian Army personnel of World War II
British Army personnel of the Malayan Emergency
British Army personnel of the Indonesia–Malaysia confrontation
British Indian Army officers
People educated at Tonbridge School